Wassenaar (population:  in ) is a municipality and town located in the province of South Holland, on the western coast of the Netherlands.

It is part of the Haaglanden region and the Rotterdam–The Hague metropolitan area.

Wassenaar is home to some of the Netherlands' richest residential neighborhoods as well as the country's most expensive street, the Groot Haesebroekseweg.

History 
There are rumours that the 12th-century Romanesque church in Wassenaar lies on the spot where the Northumbrian missionary Willibrord once landed in the Netherlands; the high dunes to the west were not formed until later.

Wassenaar long remained an unremarkable little town, known only as the home of the House of Wassenaer. It only began to gain notoriety in the 19th century when Louis Bonaparte ordered the construction of the Heerweg ("Army Road") between The Hague and Leiden, which forms the current Rijksstraatweg. In approximately 1840, Prince Frederik had the De Paauw (Peacock) palace built, where he lived for many years; it now serves as the city hall of Wassenaar.

The construction of the railway connected Rotterdam, The Hague, through Wassenaar towards its final destination the coastal area of Scheveningen in 1907, the course of which now forms the Landscheidingsweg. Wassenaar became attractive as a residence for wealthy people from Rotterdam. Buildings such as the monumental Huize Ivicke were constructed.

From September 1944 to March 1945 Wassenaar was one of launching sites used by the German Luftwaffe, commanded by SS General Hans Kammler for the V-2 rockets directed mainly towards London.

On one of the main routes to the Wassenaarseslag, the main beach for Wassenaarders, a World War II bunker can be found.  For safety reasons and the instability of the structure, it was sealed off to prevent entrance.

The American World War II and Korean War general Haywood Hansell, who helped plan the Allied bombing offensive against both Germany and Japan, lived in Wassenaar in retirement from 1957 to 1966.

In 1982 the Wassenaar Agreement between employers' organisations and trade unions in the Netherlands was signed here. This groundbreaking agreement helped in restraining wage growth in return for the adoption of policies to combat unemployment and inflation.

The Wassenaar Arrangement, a post Cold War era arms control convention, was signed here by forty member nations in May 1996.

Modern history

Since the days of Prince Frederik Wassenaar has often served as an official residence: King Willem-Alexander of the Netherlands, his wife, Queen Máxima of the Netherlands, and their daughters lived in the villa Eikenhorst at the estate De Horsten in Wassenaar from 2003 until 2019; Princess Alexia was baptized at the Romanesque church in Wassenaar. The princesses attended the Bloemcampschool in Wassenaar, founded in 1931.

In addition, the U.S. Embassy The Hague as well as several ambassadorial residences are located here, including those of Canada, South Korea, Indonesia, and Ireland. In general, there is a large expatriate community of diplomats and business people in Wassenaar, largely due to its proximity to both the international organizations and embassies in The Hague as well as to several international schools located in the Hague metro area, including the American School of The Hague (ASH) located within Wassenaar.

From 1970 until its relocation to Amsterdam in 2016, the Netherlands Institute for Advanced Study (NIAS) which provides research time, space and support for foreign and Dutch scholars, was located in Wassenaar and the Netherlands Institute of International Relations Clingendael, is situated in Huys Clingendael.

As a community, Wassenaar benefits from several parks and a network of bicycle paths. Trees, mainly beech, oak, and horse chestnut, are widespread, giving the town a green characteristic. The town centre supports a number of high-end shops, delicatessens, and bakeries as well as a cafe, bar, and restaurant. There are Football, Field Hockey, Cricket, Rugby, and Tennis clubs located in Wassenaar for locals to participate in or to enthusiastically cheer on.

Some remnants of the Atlantic wall are located on Wassenaar's beach, the Wassenaarseslag; nearly a thousand metres of underground walled tunnels are present, connecting five bunkers. The network now serves as a bat sanctuary and is not open to visits anymore. The theme park Duinrell and the race track Duindigt, the only remaining grass race track in the Netherlands, are here as well.

Despite being a relatively small town, Wassenaar is well known in the Netherlands as a result of its conspicuous wealth. Areas of the town are amongst the most affluent in the Netherlands, and residents of the town have a reputation for being bekakt or posh. Wassenaar is home to some of the most expensive neighbourhoods in the nation. The Konijnen laan has an average house price of around 2.5 million Euros, making it the most expensive street in the Netherlands. The Dutch artists Ross and Iba released a song entitled 'Wassenaar,' which poked fun at the wealth of the town.

Wassenaar has always enjoyed good relations with the neighbouring town of Voorschoten, with which it has shared a history from time immemorial. The House of Wassenaer, for example, historically resided in the Kasteel Duivenvoorde in Voorschoten. Recently, plans to merge into one municipality with Voorschoten have been introduced.

Museum Voorlinden was opened by King Willem-Alexander in 2016.

Local government 
The municipal council of Wassenaar consists of 21 seats, which are divided as follows (from the most recent election results in 2018):

 VVD, 6 seats
 Hart voor Wassenaar, 3 seats
 Lokaal Wassenaar!, 3 seats
 CDA, 3 seats
 Democratische Liberalen Wassenaar (DLW), 2 seats
 D66, 2 seats
 GroenLinks, 1 seat
 PvdA, 1 seat

Notable people from Wassenaar

Public thinking and public service 

 Jonkheer Alidius Tjarda van Starkenborgh Stachouwer (1888 – 1978 in Wassenaar) nobleman and statesman, the last colonial Governor-General of the Netherlands East Indies 
 Henk Hofstra (1904 - 1999 in Wassenaar) politician
 Gerard Helders (1905–2013) politician died in Wassenaar aged 107
  (1909-1980) World War II MI9 agent, parachuted into Nazi occupied territory.
 Johan Witteveen (1921 - 2019 in Wassenaar) retired politician 
 Sidney van den Bergh, (born 1929 in Wassenaar) Canadian retired astronomer
 Pieter Kooijmans, (1933-2013), Dutch jurist, politician and diplomat, sat at the International Court of Justice
 Teun A. van Dijk, (born 1943) discourse analyst, lived in Wassenaar between 1945 and 1962
 Corinne Hofman (born Wassenar, 1959) professor of Caribbean Archaeology at Leiden University 
 Leendert de Lange (born 1972) politician, alderman and deputy mayor in Wassenaar 2013/14 and mayor since 2019

Royal Family 
 Willem-Alexander of the Netherlands (born 1967) King of the Netherlands
 Queen Máxima of the Netherlands (born 1971) spouse of King Willem-Alexander
 Catharina-Amalia, Princess of Orange (born 2003) heir apparent to the throne of the Kingdom of the Netherlands
 Princess Alexia of the Netherlands (born 2005) second daughter of King Willem-Alexander and Queen Máxima
 Princess Ariane of the Netherlands (born 2007) third daughter of King Willem-Alexander and Queen Máxima

The Arts 

 Felix Tikotin (1893–1986) architect, art collector, art dealer; founded the Tikotin Museum of Japanese Art; lived in Wassenaar.
 Henri Friedlaender (1904–1996) Israeli typographer and book designer, lived in the attic of his house in Wassenar in WWII
 Boudewijn Büch (1948–2002) writer, poet and television presenter; grew up in Wassenar
 Theo van Gogh (1957–2004) film director and producer; TV director and producer; screenwriter, actor, critic and author
 Thom Hoffman (born 1957 in Wassenaar), actor and photographer
 Lorena Kloosterboer (born 1962), artist and author, lived in Wassenaar from 1972-1979 and again from 1987-1993
 Anthony Ingruber (born 1990), Canadian actor, voice actor and impressionist, currently lives in Wassenaar

Science & Business 

 Sidney Van den Bergh FRS (born 1929 in Wassenaar) a retired Canadian astronomer
 Morris Tabaksblat (1937–2011) ex CEO of Unilever, lived and died here
 Rattan Chadha (born 1949) joint founder of the fashion company Mexx
 Hans M. Heybroek (1927–2022) botanist, breeder of elms resistant to Dutch elm disease

Sport 
 Nico van der Voet (born 1944 in Wassenaar), water polo player
 Konrad Bartelski (born 1954), skier, lived in Wassenaar for a number of years
 Junior Strous (born 1986) racing driver, racing team owner and entrepreneur from Wassenaar
 Annebel van der Knijff (born 1996 in Wassenaar) ICF Dutch-Spanish canoe slalom paddler
 Laurens van Hoepen (born 2005), racing driver
 Mark Slats Athlete, lived in Wassenaar. The fastest solo row across the Atlantic in 30 days, 7 hours and 49 minutes in 2017.

Gallery

References

External links 

 

 
Municipalities of South Holland
Populated places in South Holland